Dasho Jigme Palden Dorji (14 December 1919 – 6 April 1964) was a Bhutanese politician and member of the Dorji family. By marriage, he was also a member of the House of Wangchuck.

The brother-in-law of Jigme Dorji Wangchuck, Dorji was close to his kinsman and accompanied the future king when he lived in the United Kingdom in 1950.

In 1928, at the age of nine, Jigme Palden Dorji was appointed the Trungpa (Administrator) of Haa Dzongkhag and in 1953, he succeeded his father Raja Tobgay, after his death, as Bhutan Agent to Kalimpong. He became the first man to hold the title Prime Minister of Bhutan (Lyonchen). This followed the upgrading of the old position in 1958 as part of a wider series of reforms by Jigme Dorji Wangchuck. As brother-in-law of the Dragon King of Bhutan Dorji helped to drive the king's modernisation policies. However his reforms antagonised both the military and the religious institutions leading to a corporal in the army assassinating him in April 1964. Brigadier Bahadur Namgyal, head of the Royal Bhutan Army, was amongst those executed for the murder plot.

Assassination 
The night before the assassination Jigme had met with Mr Avtar Singh, India's representative accredited to Bhutan at the time, at Samtse and left for Phuntsholing the day after. While playing cards with his brother Rimpochhe, Rimpochhe's wife Savitri and some others, Jigme was shot from a window ten feet to the rear of where Jigme was sitting.

On the capture and interrogation of the assassin, the assassin confessed that he received orders to shoot from Chabda Namgyal Bahadur – the army chief and an uncle to King Jigme. Chabda Namgyal was discreetly arrested at the palace quarters and was executed. Quartermaster General Bacchu Phugel was also arrested and placed under strict detention in relation to the assassination. It was purported that although Chabda Namgyal had given the orders Bacchu Phugel was actually the brains behind the assassination. Before any verdict was passed Bacchu Phugel was stabbed and killed in his cell during the night.

It was also later revealed that the pistol the assassin had used was loaned to the assassin by the mistress of King Jigme Dorji – a weapon gifted to her by the King.

The investigation into the assassination ended with the execution of Chabda Namgyal and did not unveil any motives behind the assassination. But, it is suspected that the assassination happened due to the rising power struggle between Chabda Namgyal, Bacchu Phugel and the mistress versus Jigme Palden Dorji. There was a rift between Chabda and Bacchu due to the new policies and induction of young blood into high positions by Jigme Palden Dorji. It was also reported that when the mistress was using government transportation, under the army for her personal use, Jigme Palden Dorji transferred the trucks under the civil administration which increased tensions between them.

Honours 
  King Mahendra Investiture Medal (Kingdom of Nepal, 2 May 1956).

Ancestry

References

1919 births
1964 deaths
Prime Ministers of Bhutan
Assassinated Bhutanese politicians
Deaths by firearm in Bhutan
Jigme Palden Dorji